The 2018 Sanfrecce Hiroshima season is the club's tenth consecutive season in J1 League, and 48th overall in the Japanese top flight. Sanfrecce Hiroshima are also competing in the Emperor's Cup, J.League Cup, and J.League Asia Challenge.

Competitions

J1 League

Results summary

Results by matchday

Matches

References

External links
 Sanfrecce Hiroshima official website 

Sanfrecce Hiroshima
Sanfrecce Hiroshima seasons